Elisabeth "Lisi" Pall (born 15 February 1951 in Bischofshofen) is an Austrian former alpine skier who competed in the 1968 Winter Olympics.

External links
 sports-reference.com

1951 births
Living people
Austrian female alpine skiers
Olympic alpine skiers of Austria
Alpine skiers at the 1968 Winter Olympics
People from Bischofshofen
Sportspeople from Salzburg (state)